The following is an incomplete list of some arbitrary-precision arithmetic libraries for C++.

 GMP
 MPFR
 MPIR
 TTMath
 Arbitrary Precision Math C++ Package
 Class Library for Numbers
 Number Theory Library
 Apfloat
 C++ Big Integer Library
 MAPM
 ARPREC
 InfInt
 Universal Numbers
 mp++

Footnotes

References

C++ libraries
Numerical software